Chu Jinzhao (born 11 January 1993) is a Chinese footballer who currently plays for Chengdu Better City in the China League One.

Club career
Chu Jinzhao was promoted to Chinese Super League side Tianjin Teda in 2014 after two years training with Portuguese side Varzim and Oeiras. He was loaned to China League Two side Yinchuan Helanshan for half season in the summer of 2014. In February 2015, Chu transferred to China League One side Tianjin Songjiang along with Su Yuanjie. He made his debut for the club on 11 April 2015 in a 1–1 home draw against Qingdao Jonoon. He made six league appearances in the 2016 season after Quanjian Nature Medicine took over the club and won the title of the league. Chu made his Super League debut on 15 April 2017 in a 1–1 home draw against Shanghai SIPG, coming on for Zheng Dalun in the 80th minute.

Career statistics
.

Honours

Club
Tianjin Quanjian F.C.
China League One: 2016

References

External links
 

1993 births
Living people
Chinese footballers
Footballers from Tianjin
Tianjin Jinmen Tiger F.C. players
Tianjin Tianhai F.C. players
Chengdu Better City F.C. players
Chinese Super League players
China League One players
China League Two players
Association football defenders
AD Oeiras players